Bardufoss Air Station  is a military air station located at Bardufoss in Målselv Municipality in Troms og Finnmark county in Northern Norway. It is the location of the Royal Norwegian Air Force (RNoAF) 139 Air Wing and two helicopter squadrons; the 337 Squadron operating Lynx MK 86 for the Norwegian Coast Guard and the 339 Squadron equipped with Bell 412SPs. It is also the base for the RNoAF Flight Training School. In addition, helicopter Squadron no. 334 is currently under establishment as it will be operating NH90 NFH helicopters. The delivery of the NH90 helicopters just started. 334 Squadron will only have its command post and maintenance facilities at Bardufoss, as the helicopters will be stationed on the new Fridtjof Nansen class frigates when they arrive.  

The air station is co-located on the same site as the commercial Bardufoss Airport.  The airbase is also used by the civilian community: Norwegian Aviation College (NAC) is located at the airport, and there is also a flying club (Bardufoss Flyklubb) and a parachute jumping club. Norwegian Air Shuttle currently operates three daily flights with Boeing 737 aircraft from Bardufoss Airport to Oslo Airport, Gardermoen.

History
The first plane to land at the air station was a de Havilland Tiger Moth on 26 March 1938, making it the country's oldest air station still operational. During World War II, RAF Gloster Gladiators (No. 263 Squadron RAF) and Hawker Hurricanes (No. 46 Squadron RAF) operating from Bardufoss played a vital part in keeping the Luftwaffe at bay during the fighting on the Narvik front in the April–June 1940 Norwegian Campaign. After the Allied withdrawal from Norway, the airbase was taken over by the Germans and mostly used as a base for fighters, bombers and reconnaissance planes operating against the Murmansk convoys. Fighters from Bardufoss also had the task of providing aerial support for naval operations in the area.  

When British Avro Lancasters began to bomb the battleship Tirpitz on 12 November 1944 in Operation Catechism at Håkøya near Tromsø, calls to Bardufoss failed to save the ship. The fighters failed to scramble in time and Tirpitz was sunk in ten minutes by two Tallboy bombs. Luftwaffe ace Heinrich Ehrler was originally stripped of command and sentenced to three years in prison because of this. He later died in combat when he rammed an American B-17 Flying Fortress over Germany.

The 339 Squadron was moved to Bardufoss in 1964 while the 337 Squadron arrived in 1983.

The Royal Norwegian Air Force Flight Training School was moved to Bardufoss from Trondheim Airport, Værnes in 2003.

Squadrons

Two squadrons of helicopters are stationed on this airfield: 337 operating Lynx MK 86 (since 1983) and 339 with Bell 412SP (since 1964). 

The 337 Squadron operates six Lynx MK 86 helicopters, which were delivered in 1983. Their purpose is to operate onboard Coast Guard ships. They will be replaced with eight new NH-90's. 

The 339 Squadron operates twelve Bell 412SP, primarily used as support for the Royal Norwegian Army. The Bells were delivered in between 1987 and 1990. Previous to their delivery, the squadron operated UH-1's bought used from the USA: some of those machines were received with minor battle damages and bullet holes, having seen action in the Vietnam War. The Royal Norwegian Air Force's six remaining Bells (making a total of 18) are stationed at the 720 Squadron at Rygge Air Station. 

In addition, the RNoAF Flight Training School is located here. The school operates the Saab Safari.

UK Royal Naval Commando and Royal Marine units have used Bardufoss as a training base for many years. It is also used as a base for cold weather training for Royal Air Force, British Army and Royal Navy helicopter crews. During the Cold War, training was especially concentrated during the winter with repair parties during the Norwegian summer. These operations were given the title of "Clockwork".

References

External links
Picture and information regarding Bardufoss Airport from Avinor
Norwegian Air Force; Bardufoss Airbase
Folkebladet.no: Ørnen har landet

Norwegian Army Air Service stations
Luftwaffe airports in Norway
Royal Norwegian Air Force stations
Airports in Troms og Finnmark
Målselv
1938 establishments in Norway
Airports established in 1938
Military installations in Troms og Finnmark